Korczowa  (Korchova) is a village in the administrative district of Gmina Radymno, within Jarosław County, Subcarpathian Voivodeship, in south-eastern Poland, close to the border with Ukraine.

Before World War II the settlement was a farmstead in Gnojnice which were a suburb of nearby Krakowiec.

In 2006 the village had a population of 660.

The Korczowa-Krakovets road border crossing with Ukraine is located nearby. As Poland became part of the Schengen Area on 21 December 2007, this border crossing is a Schengen external border. The European route E40 crosses the border here. The eastern terminus of Poland's A4 motorway and National Road 94 are located at Korczowa.

References

Korczowa